Tiago Rafael Maia da Silva (born 2 June 1993) is a Portuguese professional footballer who plays for Vitória S.C. as a midfielder.

He made over 200 Primeira Liga appearances for Belenenses, Feirense and Vitória de Guimarães. Abroad, he won the Super League Greece for Olympiacos and played in the EFL Championship for Nottingham Forest.

Club career

Belenenses
Born in Lisbon, Silva joined local C.F. Os Belenenses' youth system at the age of 16, from S.L. Benfica. He made his senior debut on 29 July 2012, playing the full 90 minutes in a 1–1 home draw against U.D. Oliveirense in the first round of the Taça da Liga. His first match in the second division occurred on 11 August, a 3–1 home win over C.D. Feirense where he also started.

Silva ultimately contributed 37 games and four goals as the Estádio do Restelo club returned to the Primeira Liga after a three-year absence. He made his debut in the Portuguese top flight on 18 August 2013, being booked in the 0–3 home loss to Rio Ave FC.

Feirense
From 2016 to 2018, Silva played with Feirense of the same league on loan. He scored six and three goals in each season, respectively, and on 18 February 2018 the move was made permanent as the player signed a three-year contract.

Nottingham Forest
On 5 July 2019, Silva joined English side Nottingham Forest on a two-year deal. His maiden appearance in the EFL Championship took place on 3 August, when he played 62 minutes of a 1–2 home defeat against West Bromwich Albion. He scored his first goal ten days later, the only in the first round of the EFL Cup at home to Fleetwood Town.

Olympiacos
Silva agreed to a contract at Olympiacos F.C. on 3 October 2020, for an undisclosed fee. He played 21 competitive matches during his spell, including 16 in the Super League Greece for the champions.

Vitória Guimarães
On 7 August 2021, Silva returned to his country and moved to Vitória de Guimarães; the five-year deal included a €50 million buyout clause, while Olympiacos remained entitled to 50% of the player's rights regarding a future sale. He scored his first European goal the following 21 July in the second qualifying round of the UEFA Europa Conference League at home to Puskás Akadémia FC, a 3–0 win; in the next round, he was sent off in a 1–0 victory over HNK Hajduk Split that nonetheless saw his team eliminated.

International career
Silva won the first of his five caps for Portugal at under-21 level on 14 August 2013, featuring 31 minutes in a 5–2 friendly win over Switzerland. He was also picked by manager Rui Jorge for his squad that appeared at the 2016 Summer Olympics, playing three matches in Rio de Janeiro in an eventual quarter-final exit.

Career statistics

Honours
Belenenses
Segunda Liga: 2012–13

Olympiacos
Super League Greece: 2020–21

References

External links
 

1993 births
Living people
Portuguese footballers
Footballers from Lisbon
Association football midfielders
Primeira Liga players
Liga Portugal 2 players
C.F. Os Belenenses players
C.D. Feirense players
Vitória S.C. players
English Football League players
Nottingham Forest F.C. players
Super League Greece players
Olympiacos F.C. players
Portugal youth international footballers
Portugal under-21 international footballers
Footballers at the 2016 Summer Olympics
Olympic footballers of Portugal
Portuguese expatriate footballers
Expatriate footballers in England
Expatriate footballers in Greece
Portuguese expatriate sportspeople in England
Portuguese expatriate sportspeople in Greece